Peringiella is a genus of minute sea snails, marine gastropod mollusks or micromollusks in the family Rissoidae.

Species
Species within the genus Peringiella include:

 Peringiella denticulata Ponder, 1985
 Peringiella elegans (Locard, 1892)

References

Rissoidae